Abdullah Kassim Hanga (1932–1969) was Prime Minister of Zanzibar from 12 January 1964 to 27 April 1964. He was executed without trial for an alleged 1967 plot to overthrow the Karume regime of the now united new country of Tanzania  

Russian journalist Yelena Khanga is his daughter.

References 

1932 births
1969 deaths
Zanzibari politicians
Government ministers of Zanzibar